CCMC may refer to:
 Cataract-microcornea syndrome
 Cebu City Medical Center
 Central Crisis Management Cell, a secret security committee formed by the Syrian government to coordinate a crackdown on revolt during the Syrian civil war
 Coimbatore City Municipal Corporation
 Comité des Constructeurs du Marché Commun (1972-1991), automobile industry group, the predecessor of European Automobile Manufacturers Association
 Committee on the Costs of Medical Care, an early advocacy group for national health insurance in the United States of America
 Communications Consortium Media Center
 Communist Chinese military companies
 Community Coordinated Modeling Center
 Connecticut Children's Medical Center
 Cultural Council for Monterey County
 CCMC (band), a Canadian free improvisation group